Jerold Promes (born 9 March 1984) is a Dutch footballer who plays as a centre back.

Club career
Born in Amsterdam, Promes came through the youth ranks of Ajax but did not make the grade at his hometown club and joined RKC Waalwijk in 2004. After a long injury lay-off he was signed by AZ to play in their youth team and then Danny Blind lined him up at Sparta Rotterdam in summer 2007. He left the club in 2009, joining SC Telstar in the Dutch second division, where he became team captain. After playing four seasons for Telstar, he left the club as a free agent. 

In July 2013, Promes signed a three-year contract with VVV-Venlo. A shoulder injury would, however, keep him sidelined for large parts of his first season in Venlo. The injury initially occurred in a KNVB Cup match against SC Heerenveen, where his shoulder was dislocated, and the same thing happened two months later in an away match against Helmond Sport. Therefore, surgery turned out to be necessary. In the following two seasons, Promes grew into a regular starter in defense. On 27 May 2016, VVV announced that his expiring contract had been extended for another season. On 22 February 2019, Promes broke his left knee cap during a home game against Heracles Almelo, as a result of which he was not expected to be able to play football until the end of 2019. At the end of March 2019, VVV announced that the contract with the 35-year-old Promes would not be extended. He would, however, start rehabilitating at the club under the supervision of a physiotherapist and after his recovery he would be given the opportunity to earn a new contract.

Career statistics

Honours

Club
VVV-Venlo
Eerste Divisie: 2016–17

References

External links
 
 

Living people
1984 births
Association football defenders
Dutch footballers
Dutch sportspeople of Surinamese descent
Eredivisie players
Eerste Divisie players
RKC Waalwijk players
Sparta Rotterdam players
SC Telstar players
VVV-Venlo players
Footballers from Amsterdam